Garbh Uisge is a river of approximately 7 km in the Trossachs of Scotland just north-west Callander. It is the outflow of Loch Lubnaig and joins with Eas Gobhain west of Callander to form the River Teith. The name of the river, Garbh Uisge, is Gaelic for "Rough Water", reflecting the nature of the river. The river is often informally called the River Leny due to the Falls of Leny, where the river crosses the Highland Boundary Fault, and because it flows through the Pass of Leny.

References

Rivers of Stirling (council area)
Tributaries of the Teith